This page provides supplementary chemical data on vitexin.

Material Safety Data Sheet 

The handling of this chemical may incur notable safety precautions. It is highly recommend that you seek the Material Safety Datasheet (MSDS) for this chemical from a reliable source such as eChemPortal, and follow its directions.
 Sigma Aldrich MSDS from SDSdata.org

Spectral data

References
 

Chemical data pages
Chemical data pages cleanup